The year 2002 is the 2nd year in the history of the Maximum Fighting Championship, a mixed martial arts promotion based in Canada. In 2002 Maximum Fighting Championship held 4 events beginning with, MFC 3: Canadian Pride.

Events list

MFC 3: Canadian Pride

MFC 3: Canadian Pride was an event held on March 3, 2002 in Grande Prairie, Alberta, Canada.

Results

MFC 4: New Groundz

MFC 4: New Groundz was an event held on June 1, 2002 at the Max Bell Arena in Calgary, Alberta, Canada.

Results

MFC 5: Sweet Redemption

MFC 5: Sweet Redemption was an event held on September 21, 2002 at The AgriCom in Edmonton, Alberta, Canada.

Results

MFC: Unplugged

MFC: Unplugged was an event held on November 29, 2002 at The Joint Night Club in Edmonton, Alberta, Canada.

Results

See also 
 Maximum Fighting Championship
 List of Maximum Fighting Championship events

References

Maximum Fighting Championship events
2002 in mixed martial arts
Events in Edmonton
Events in Calgary